Penguin Great Loves is a series of books published by Penguin Books in the UK.

The books

See also

Great Books of the 20th Century
Penguin Essentials
Penguin Red Classics
Ten of the Best

References

External links
 

Lists of novels
Penguin Books book series